Hubertella is a genus of Asian dwarf spiders that was first described by Norman I. Platnick in 1989.  it contains only three species, found in Nepal: H. montana, H. orientalis, and H. thankurensis.

See also
 List of Linyphiidae species (A–H)

References

Araneomorphae genera
Linyphiidae
Spiders of Asia